Bruchsalia (minor planet designation: 455 Bruchsalia) is a main-belt asteroid. It was discovered by Max Wolf and Friedrich Karl Arnold Schwassmann on May 22, 1900. Its provisional name was 1900 FG.

References

External links 
 Lightcurve plot of (455) Bruchsalia, Antelope Hills Observatory
 
 

Background asteroids
Bruchsalia
Bruchsalia
Bruchsalia
CP-type asteroids (Tholen)
19000522